External ballistics or exterior ballistics is the part of ballistics that deals with the behavior of a projectile in flight. The projectile may be powered or un-powered, guided or unguided, spin or fin stabilized, flying through an atmosphere or in the vacuum of space, but most certainly flying under the influence of a gravitational field.

Gun-launched projectiles may be unpowered, deriving all their velocity from the propellant's ignition until the projectile exits the gun barrel. However, exterior ballistics analysis also deals with the trajectories of rocket-assisted gun-launched projectiles and gun-launched rockets; and rockets that acquire all their trajectory velocity from the interior ballistics of their on-board propulsion system, either a rocket motor or air-breathing engine, both during their boost phase and after motor burnout.  External ballistics is also concerned with the free-flight of other projectiles, such as balls, arrows etc.

Forces acting on the projectile
When in flight, the main or major forces acting on the projectile are gravity, drag, and if present, wind; if in powered flight, thrust; and if guided, the forces imparted by the control surfaces.

In small arms external ballistics applications, gravity imparts a downward acceleration on the projectile, causing it to drop from the line of sight. Drag, or the air resistance, decelerates the projectile with a force proportional to the square of the velocity. Wind makes the projectile deviate from its trajectory. During flight, gravity, drag, and wind have a major impact on the path of the projectile, and must be accounted for when predicting how the projectile will travel.

For medium to longer ranges and flight times, besides gravity, air resistance and wind, several intermediate or meso variables described in the external factors paragraph have to be taken into account for small arms. Meso variables can become significant for firearms users that have to deal with angled shot scenarios or extended ranges, but are seldom relevant at common hunting and target shooting distances.

For long to very long small arms target ranges and flight times, minor effects and forces such as the ones described in the long range factors paragraph become important and have to be taken into account. The practical effects of these minor variables are generally irrelevant for most firearms users, since normal group scatter at short and medium ranges prevails over the influence these effects exert on projectile trajectories.

At extremely long ranges, artillery must fire projectiles along trajectories that are not even approximately straight; they are closer to parabolic, although air resistance affects this. Extreme long range projectiles are subject to significant deflections, depending on circumstances, from the line toward the target; and all external factors and long range factors must be taken into account when aiming. In very large-calibre artillery cases, like the Paris Gun, very subtle effects that are not covered in this article can further refine aiming solutions.

In the case of ballistic missiles, the altitudes involved have a significant effect as well, with part of the flight taking place in a near-vacuum well above a rotating earth, steadily moving the target from where it was at launch time.

Stabilizing non-spherical projectiles during flight
Two methods can be employed to stabilize non-spherical projectiles during flight:
 Projectiles like arrows or arrow like sabots such as the M829 Armor-Piercing, Fin-Stabilized, Discarding Sabot (APFSDS) achieve stability by forcing their center of pressure (CP) behind their center of Mass (CM) with tail surfaces. The CP behind the CM condition yields stable projectile flight, meaning the projectile will not overturn during flight through the atmosphere due to aerodynamic forces.
 Projectiles like small arms bullets and artillery shells must deal with their CP being in front of their CM, which destabilizes these projectiles during flight. To stabilize such projectiles the projectile is spun around its longitudinal (leading to trailing) axis. The spinning mass creates gyroscopic forces that keep the bullet's length axis resistant to the destabilizing overturning torque of the CP being in front of the CM.

Main effects in external ballistics

Projectile/bullet drop and projectile path

The effect of gravity on a projectile in flight is often referred to as projectile drop or bullet drop. It is important to understand the effect of gravity when zeroing the sighting components of a gun. To plan for projectile drop and compensate properly, one must understand parabolic shaped trajectories.

Projectile/bullet drop
In order for a projectile to impact any distant target, the barrel must be inclined to a positive elevation angle relative to the target. This is due to the fact that the projectile will begin to respond to the effects of gravity the instant it is free from the mechanical constraints of the bore. The imaginary line down the center axis of the bore and out to infinity is called the line of departure and is the line on which the projectile leaves the barrel. Due to the effects of gravity a projectile can never impact a target higher than the line of departure. When a positively inclined projectile travels downrange, it arcs below the line of departure as it is being deflected off its initial path by gravity. Projectile/Bullet drop is defined as the vertical distance of the projectile below the line of departure from the bore. Even when the line of departure is tilted upward or downward, projectile drop is still defined as the distance between the bullet and the line of departure at any point along the trajectory. Projectile drop does not describe the actual trajectory of the projectile.
Knowledge of projectile drop however is useful when conducting a direct comparison of two different projectiles regarding the shape of their trajectories, comparing the effects of variables such as velocity and drag behavior.

Projectile/bullet path
For hitting a distant target an appropriate positive elevation angle is required that is achieved by angling the line of sight from the shooter's eye through the centerline of the sighting system downward toward the line of departure. This can be accomplished by simply adjusting the sights down mechanically, or by securing the entire sighting system to a sloped mounting having a known downward slope, or by a combination of both. This procedure has the effect of elevating the muzzle when the barrel must be subsequently raised to align the sights with the target. A projectile leaving a muzzle at a given elevation angle follows a ballistic trajectory whose characteristics are dependent upon various factors such as muzzle velocity, gravity, and aerodynamic drag. This ballistic trajectory is referred to as the bullet path.  If the projectile is spin stabilized, aerodynamic forces will also predictably arc the trajectory slightly to the right, if the rifling employs "right-hand twist."  Some barrels are cut with left-hand twist, and the bullet will arc to the left, as a result.  Therefore, to compensate for this path deviation, the sights also have to be adjusted left or right, respectively.  A constant wind also predictably affects the bullet path, pushing it slightly left or right, and a little bit more up and down, depending on the wind direction.  The magnitude of these deviations are also affected by whether the bullet is on the upward or downward slope of the trajectory, due to a phenomenon called "yaw of repose," where a spinning bullet tends to steadily and predictably align slightly off center from its point mass trajectory.  Nevertheless, each of these trajectory perturbations are predictable once the projectile aerodynamic coefficients are established, through a combination of detailed analytical modeling and test range measurements.

Projectile/bullet path analysis is of great use to shooters because it allows them to establish ballistic tables that will predict how much vertical elevation and horizontal deflection corrections must be applied to the sight line for shots at various known distances. The most detailed ballistic tables are developed for long range artillery and are based on six-degree-of-freedom trajectory analysis, which accounts for aerodynamic behavior along the three axial directions—elevation, range, and deflection—and the three rotational directions—pitch, yaw, and spin.  For small arms applications, trajectory modeling can often be simplified to calculations involving only four of these degrees-of-freedom, lumping the effects of pitch, yaw and spin into the effect of a yaw-of-repose to account for trajectory deflection.  Once detailed range tables are established, shooters can relatively quickly adjust sights based on the range to target, wind, air temperature and humidity, and other geometric considerations, such as terrain elevation differences.

Projectile path values are determined by both the sight height, or the distance of the line of sight above the bore centerline, and the range at which the sights are zeroed, which in turn determines the elevation angle. A projectile following a ballistic trajectory has both forward and vertical motion. Forward motion is slowed due to air resistance, and in point mass modeling the vertical motion is dependent on a combination of the elevation angle and gravity. Initially, the projectile is rising with respect to the line of sight or the horizontal sighting plane. The projectile eventually reaches its apex (highest point in the trajectory parabola) where the vertical speed component decays to zero under the effect of gravity, and then begins to descend, eventually impacting the earth. The farther the distance to the intended target, the greater the elevation angle and the higher the apex.

The projectile path crosses the horizontal sighting plane two times. The point closest to the gun occurs while the bullet is climbing through the line of sight and is called the near zero. The second point occurs as the projectile is descending through the line of sight. It is called the far zero and defines the current sight in distance for the gun. Projectile path is described numerically as distances above or below the horizontal sighting plane at various points along the trajectory. This is in contrast to projectile drop which is referenced to the plane containing the line of departure regardless of the elevation angle. Since each of these two parameters uses a different reference datum, significant confusion can result because even though a projectile is tracking well below the line of departure it can still be gaining actual and significant height with respect to the line of sight as well as the surface of the earth in the case of a horizontal or near horizontal shot taken over flat terrain.

Maximum point-blank range and battle zero
Knowledge of the projectile drop and path has some practical uses to shooters even if it does not describe the actual trajectory of the projectile. For example, if the vertical projectile position over a certain range reach is within the vertical height of the target area the shooter wants to hit, the point of aim does not necessarily need to be adjusted over that range; the projectile is considered to have a sufficiently flat point-blank range trajectory for that particular target. Also known as "battle zero", maximum point-blank range is also of importance to the military. Soldiers are instructed to fire at any target within this range by simply placing their weapon's sights on the center of mass of the enemy target. Any errors in range estimation are tactically irrelevant, as a well-aimed shot will hit the torso of the enemy soldier. The current trend for elevated sights and higher-velocity cartridges in assault rifles is in part due to a desire to extend the maximum point-blank range, which makes the rifle easier to use.

Drag resistance

Mathematical models, such as computational fluid dynamics, are used for calculating the effects of drag or air resistance; they are quite complex and not yet completely reliable, but research is ongoing. The most reliable method, therefore, of establishing the necessary projectile aerodynamic properties to properly describe flight trajectories is by empirical measurement.

Fixed drag curve models generated for standard-shaped projectiles

Use of ballistics tables or ballistics software based on the Mayevski/Siacci method and G1 drag model, introduced in 1881, are the most common method used to work with external ballistics. Projectiles are described by a ballistic coefficient, or BC, which combines the air resistance of the bullet shape (the drag coefficient) and its sectional density (a function of mass and bullet diameter).

The deceleration due to drag that a projectile with mass m, velocity v, and diameter d will experience is proportional to 1/BC, 1/m, v² and d². The BC gives the ratio of ballistic efficiency compared to the standard G1 projectile, which is a fictitious projectile with a flat base, a length of 3.28 calibers/diameters, and a 2 calibers/diameters radius tangential curve for the point.
The G1 standard projectile originates from the "C" standard reference projectile defined by the German steel, ammunition and armaments manufacturer Krupp in 1881. The G1 model standard projectile has a BC of 1. The French Gâvre Commission decided to use this projectile as their first reference projectile, giving the G1 name.

Sporting bullets, with a calibre d ranging from 0.177 to 0.50 inches (4.50 to 12.7 mm), have G1 BC's in the range 0.12 to slightly over 1.00, with 1.00 being the most aerodynamic, and 0.12 being the least. Very-low-drag bullets with BC's ≥ 1.10 can be designed and produced on CNC precision lathes out of mono-metal rods, but they often have to be fired from custom made full bore rifles with special barrels.

Sectional density is a very important aspect of a projectile or bullet, and is for a round projectile like a bullet the ratio of frontal surface area (half the bullet diameter squared, times pi) to bullet mass. Since, for a given bullet shape, frontal surface increases as the square of the calibre, and mass increases as the cube of the diameter, then sectional density grows linearly with bore diameter. Since BC combines shape and sectional density, a half scale model of the G1 projectile will have a BC of 0.5, and a quarter scale model will have a BC of 0.25.

Since different projectile shapes will respond differently to changes in velocity (particularly between supersonic and subsonic velocities), a BC provided by a bullet manufacturer will be an average BC that represents the common range of velocities for that bullet. For rifle bullets, this will probably be a supersonic velocity, for pistol bullets it will probably be subsonic. For projectiles that travel through the supersonic, transonic and subsonic flight regimes BC is not well approximated by a single constant, but is considered to be a function BC(M) of the Mach number M; here M equals the projectile velocity divided by the speed of sound. During the flight of the projectile the M will decrease, and therefore (in most cases) the BC will also decrease.

Most ballistic tables or software takes for granted that one specific drag function correctly describes the drag and hence the flight characteristics of a bullet related to its ballistics coefficient. Those models do not differentiate between wadcutter, flat-based, spitzer, boat-tail, very-low-drag, etc. bullet types or shapes. They assume one invariable drag function as indicated by the published BC.

Several drag curve models optimized for several standard projectile shapes are however available. The resulting fixed drag curve models for several standard projectile shapes or types are referred to as the:

 G1 or Ingalls (flatbase with 2 caliber (blunt) nose ogive - by far the most popular)
 G2 (Aberdeen J projectile)
 G5 (short 7.5° boat-tail, 6.19 calibers long tangent ogive)
 G6 (flatbase, 6 calibers long secant ogive)
 G7 (long 7.5° boat-tail, 10 calibers tangent ogive, preferred by some manufacturers for very-low-drag bullets)
 G8 (flatbase, 10 calibers long secant ogive)
 GL (blunt lead nose)

How different speed regimes affect .338 calibre rifle bullets can be seen in the .338 Lapua Magnum product brochure which states Doppler radar established G1 BC data. The reason for publishing data like in this brochure is that the Siacci/Mayevski G1 model can not be tuned for the drag behavior of a specific projectile whose shape significantly deviates from the used reference projectile shape. Some ballistic software designers, who based their programs on the Siacci/Mayevski G1 model, give the user the possibility to enter several different G1 BC constants for different speed regimes to calculate ballistic predictions that closer match a bullets flight behavior at longer ranges compared to calculations that use only one BC constant.

The above example illustrates the central problem fixed drag curve models have. These models will only yield satisfactory accurate predictions as long as the projectile of interest has the same shape as the reference projectile or a shape that closely resembles the reference projectile. Any deviation from the reference projectile shape will result in less accurate predictions. How much a projectile deviates from the applied reference projectile is mathematically expressed by the form factor (i). The form factor can be used to compare the drag experienced by a projectile of interest to the drag experienced by the employed reference projectile at a given velocity (range). The problem that the actual drag curve of a projectile can significantly deviate from the fixed drag curve of any employed reference projectile systematically limits the traditional drag resistance modeling approach. The relative simplicity however makes that it can be explained to and understood by the general shooting public and hence is also popular amongst ballistic software prediction developers and bullet manufacturers that want to market their products.

More advanced drag models

Pejsa model
Another attempt at building a ballistic calculator is the model presented in 1980 by Dr. Arthur J. Pejsa. Dr. Pejsa claims on his website that his method was consistently capable of predicting (supersonic) rifle bullet trajectories within 2.5 mm (0.1 in) and bullet velocities within 0.3 m/s (1 ft/s) out to 914 m (1,000 yd) in theory. The Pejsa model is a closed-form solution.

The Pejsa model can predict a projectile within a given flight regime (for example the supersonic flight regime) with only two velocity measurements, a distance between said velocity measurements, and a slope or deceleration constant factor. The model allows the drag curve to change slopes (true/calibrate) or curvature at three different points. Down range velocity measurement data can be provided around key inflection points allowing for more accurate calculations of the projectile retardation rate, very similar to a Mach vs CD table. The Pejsa model allows the slope factor to be tuned to account for subtle differences in the retardation rate of different bullet shapes and sizes. It ranges from 0.1 (flat-nose bullets) to 0.9 (very-low-drag bullets). If this slope or deceleration constant factor is unknown a default value of 0.5 is used. With the help of test firing measurements the slope constant for a particular bullet/rifle system/shooter combination can be determined. These test firings should preferably be executed at 60% and for extreme long range ballistic predictions also at 80% to 90% of the supersonic range of the projectiles of interest, staying away from erratic transonic effects. With this the Pejsa model can easily be tuned. A practical downside of the Pejsa model is that accurate projectile specific down range velocity measurements to provide these better predictions can not be easily performed by the vast majority of shooting enthusiasts.

An average retardation coefficient can be calculated for any given slope constant factor if velocity data points are known and distance between said velocity measurements is known. Obviously this is true only within the same flight regime. With velocity actual speed is meant, as velocity is a vector quantity and speed is the magnitude of the velocity vector. Because the power function does not have constant curvature a simple chord average cannot be used. The Pejsa model uses a weighted average retardation coefficient weighted at 0.25 range. The closer velocity is more heavily weighted. The retardation coefficient is measured in feet whereas range is measured in yards hence 0.25 * 3.0 = 0.75, in some places 0.8 rather than 0.75 is used. The 0.8 comes from rounding in order to allow easy entry on hand calculators. Since the Pejsa model does not use a simple chord weighted average, two velocity measurements are used to find the chord average retardation coefficient at midrange between the two velocity measurements points, limiting it to short range accuracy. In order to find the starting retardation coefficient Dr. Pejsa provides two separate equations in his two books. The first involves the power function. The second equation is identical to the one used to find the weighted average at R / 4; add N * (R/2) where R is the range in feet to the chord average retardation coefficient at midrange and where N is the slope constant factor. After the starting retardation coefficient is found the opposite procedure is used in order find the weighted average at R / 4; the starting retardation coefficient minus N * (R/4). In other words, N is used as the slope of the chord line. Dr. Pejsa states that he expanded his drop formula in a power series in order to prove that the weighted average retardation coefficient at R / 4 was a good approximation. For this Dr. Pejsa compared the power series expansion of his drop formula to some other unnamed drop formula's power expansion to reach his conclusions. The fourth term in both power series matched when the retardation coefficient at 0.25 range was used in Pejsa's drop formula. The fourth term was also the first term to use N. The higher terms involving N where insignificant and disappeared at N = 0.36, which according to Dr. Pejsa was a lucky coincidence making for an exceedingly accurate linear approximation, especially for N's around 0.36. If a retardation coefficient function is used exact average values for any N can be obtained because from calculus it is trivial to find the average of any integrable function. Dr. Pejsa states that the retardation coefficient can be modeled by C * VN where C is a fitting coefficient which disappears during the derivation of the drop formula and N the slope constant factor.

The retardation coefficient equals the velocity squared divided by the retardation rate A. Using an average retardation coefficient allows the Pejsa model to be a closed-form expression within a given flight regime.

In order to allow the use of a G1 ballistic coefficient rather than velocity data Dr. Pejsa provided two reference drag curves. The first reference drag curve is based purely on the Siacci/Mayevski retardation rate function. The second reference drag curve is adjusted to equal the Siacci/Mayevski retardation rate function at a projectile velocity of 2600 fps (792.5 m/s) using a .30-06 Springfield Cartridge, Ball, Caliber .30 M2  rifle spitzer bullet with a slope or deceleration constant factor of 0.5 in the supersonic flight regime. In other flight regimes the second Pejsa reference drag curve model uses slope constant factors of 0.0 or -4.0. These deceleration constant factors can be verified by backing out Pejsa's formulas (the drag curve segments fits the form V(2 - N) / C and the retardation coefficient curve segments fits the form V2 / (V(2 - N) / C) = C * VN where C is a fitting coefficient). The empirical test data Pejsa used to determine the exact shape of his chosen reference drag curve and pre-defined mathematical function that returns the retardation coefficient at a given Mach number was provided by the US military for the Cartridge, Ball, Caliber .30 M2 bullet. The calculation of the retardation coefficient function also involves air density, which Pejsa did not mention explicitly. The Siacci/Mayevski G1 model uses the following deceleration parametrization (60 °F, 30 inHg and 67% humidity, air density ρ = 1.2209 kg/m3). Dr. Pejsa suggests using the second drag curve because the Siacci/Mayevski G1 drag curve does not provide a good fit for modern spitzer bullets. To obtain relevant retardation coefficients for optimal long range modeling Dr. Pejsa suggested using accurate projectile specific down range velocity measurement data for a particular projectile to empirically derive the average retardation coefficient rather than using a reference drag curve derived average retardation coefficient. Further he suggested using ammunition with reduced propellant loads to empirically test actual projectile flight behavior at lower velocities. When working with reduced propellant loads utmost care must be taken to avoid dangerous or catastrophic conditions (detonations) with can occur when firing experimental loads in firearms.

Manges model
Although not as well known as the Pejsa model, an additional alternative ballistic model was presented in 1989 by Colonel Duff Manges (U S Army Retired) at the American Defense Preparedness (ADPA) 11th International Ballistic Symposium held at the Brussels Congress Center, Brussels, Belgium, May 9–11, 1989.  A paper titled "Closed Form Trajectory Solutions for Direct Fire Weapons Systems" appears in the proceedings, Volume 1, Propulsion Dynamics, Launch Dynamics, Flight Dynamics, pages 665–674. Originally conceived to model projectile drag for 120 mm tank gun ammunition, the novel drag coefficient formula has been applied subsequently to ballistic trajectories of center-fired rifle ammunition with results comparable to those claimed for the Pejsa model.

The Manges model uses a first principles theoretical approach that eschews "G" curves and "ballistic coefficients" based on the standard G1 and other similarity curves.  The theoretical description has three main parts. The first is to develop and solve a formulation of the two dimensional differential equations of motion governing flat trajectories of point mass projectiles by defining mathematically a set of quadratures that permit closed form solutions for the trajectory differential equations of motion.  A sequence of successive approximation drag coefficient functions is generated that converge rapidly to actual observed drag data.  The vacuum trajectory, simplified aerodynamic, d'Antonio, and Euler drag law models are special cases. The Manges drag law thereby provides a unifying influence with respect to earlier models used to obtain two dimensional closed form solutions to the point-mass equations of motion.  The third purpose of this paper is to describe a least squares fitting procedure for obtaining the new drag functions from observed experimental data.  The author claims that results show excellent agreement with six degree of freedom numerical calculations for modern tank ammunition and available published firing tables for center-fired rifle ammunition having a wide variety of shapes and sizes.

A Microsoft Excel application has been authored that uses least squares fits of wind tunnel acquired tabular drag coefficients.  Alternatively, manufacturer supplied ballistic trajectory data, or Doppler acquired velocity data can be fitted as well to calibrate the model.  The Excel application then employs custom macroinstructions to calculate the trajectory variables of interest. A modified 4th order Runge-Kutta integration algorithm is used.  Like Pejsa, Colonel Manges claims center-fired rifle accuracies to the nearest one tenth of an inch for bullet position, and nearest foot per second for the projectile velocity.

The Proceedings of the 11th International Ballistic Symposium are available through the National Defense Industrial Association (NDIA) at the website http://www.ndia.org/Resources/Pages/Publication_Catalog.aspx .

Six degrees of freedom model
There are also advanced professional ballistic models like PRODAS available. These are based on six degrees of freedom (6 DoF) calculations. 6 DoF modeling accounts for x, y, and z position in space along with the projectiles pitch, yaw, and roll rates. 6 DoF modeling needs such elaborate data input, knowledge of the employed projectiles and expensive data collection and verification methods that it is impractical for non-professional ballisticians, but not impossible for the curious, computer literate, and mathematically inclined.  Semi-empirical aeroprediction models have been developed that reduced extensive test range data on a wide variety of projectile shapes, normalizing dimensional input geometries to calibers; accounting for nose length and radius, body length, and boattail size, and allowing the full set of 6-dof aerodynamic coefficients to be estimated.  Early research on spin-stabilized aeroprediction software resulted in the SPINNER computer program.  The FINNER aeroprediction code calculates 6-dof inputs for fin stabilized projectiles.  Solids modeling software that determines the projectile parameters of mass, center of gravity, axial and transverse moments of inertia necessary for stability analysis are also readily available, and simple to computer program.   Finally, algorithms for 6-dof numerical integration suitable to a 4th order Runge-Kutta are readily available. All that is required for the amateur ballistician to investigate the finer analytical details of projectile trajectories, along with bullet nutation and precession behavior, is computer programming determination. Nevertheless, for the small arms enthusiast, aside from academic curiosity, one will discover that being able to predict trajectories to 6-dof accuracy is probably not of practical significance compared to more simplified point mass trajectories based on published bullet ballistic coefficients.  6 DoF is generally used by the aerospace and defense industry and military organizations that study the ballistic behavior of a limited number of (intended) military issue projectiles. Calculated 6 DoF trends can be incorporated as correction tables in more conventional ballistic software applications.

Though 6 DoF modeling and software applications are used by professional well equipped organizations for decades, the computing power restrictions of mobile computing devices like (ruggedized) personal digital assistants, tablet computers or smartphones impaired field use as calculations generally have to be done on the fly. In 2016 the Scandinavian ammunition manufacturer Nammo Lapua Oy released a 6 DoF calculation model based ballistic free software named Lapua Ballistics. The software is distributed as a mobile app only and available for Android and iOS devices. The employed 6 DoF model is however limited to Lapua bullets as a 6 DoF solver needs bullet specific drag coefficient (Cd)/Doppler radar data and geometric dimensions of the projectile(s) of interest. For other bullets the Lapua Ballistics solver is limited to and based on G1 or G7 ballistic coefficients and the Mayevski/Siacci method.

Artillery software suites
Military organizations have developed ballistic models like the NATO Armament Ballistic Kernel (NABK) for fire-control systems for artillery like the SG2 Shareable (Fire Control) Software Suite (S4) from the NATO Army Armaments Group (NAAG). The NATO Armament Ballistic Kernel is a 4-DoF modified point mass model. This is a compromise between a simple point mass model and a computationally intensive 6-DoF model.
A six- and seven-degree-of-freedom standard called BALCO has also been developed within NATO working groups. BALCO is a trajectory simulation program based on the mathematical model defined by the NATO Standardization Recommendation 4618. The primary goal of BALCO is to compute high-fidelity trajectories for both conventional axisymmetric and precision-guided projectiles featuring control surfaces. The BALCO trajectory model is a FORTRAN 2003 program that implements the following features:
 6/7‐DoF equations of motion
 7th‐order Runge‐Kutta‐Fehlberg integration
 Earth models
 Atmosphere models
 Aerodynamic models
 Thrust and Base Burn models
 Actuator models
The predictions these models yield are subject to comparison study.

Doppler radar-measurements
For the precise establishment of drag or air resistance effects on projectiles, Doppler radar measurements are required. Weibel 1000e or Infinition BR-1001 Doppler radars are used by governments, professional ballisticians, defence forces and a few ammunition manufacturers to obtain real-world data of the flight behavior of projectiles of their interest. Correctly established state of the art Doppler radar measurements can determine the flight behavior of projectiles as small as airgun pellets in three-dimensional space to within a few millimetres accuracy. The gathered data regarding the projectile deceleration can be derived and expressed in several ways, such as ballistic coefficients (BC) or drag coefficients (Cd).  Because a spinning projectile experiences both precession and nutation about its center of gravity as it flies, further data reduction of doppler radar measurements is required to separate yaw induced drag and lift coefficients from the zero yaw drag coefficient, in order to make measurements fully applicable to 6-dof trajectory analysis.

Doppler radar measurement results for a lathe-turned monolithic solid .50 BMG very-low-drag bullet (Lost River J40 .510-773 grain monolithic solid bullet / twist rate 1:15 in) look like this:

The initial rise in the BC value is attributed to a projectile's always present yaw and precession out of the bore. The test results were obtained from many shots not just a single shot. The bullet was assigned 1.062 for its BC number by the bullet's manufacturer Lost River Ballistic Technologies.

Doppler radar measurement results for a Lapua GB528 Scenar 19.44 g (300 gr) 8.59 mm (0.338 in) calibre very-low-drag bullet look like this:

This tested bullet experiences its maximum drag coefficient when entering the transonic flight regime around Mach 1.200.

With the help of Doppler radar measurements projectile specific drag models can be established that are most useful when shooting at extended ranges where the bullet speed slows to the transonic speed region near the speed of sound. This is where the projectile drag predicted by mathematic modeling can significantly depart from the actual drag experienced by the projectile. Further Doppler radar measurements are used to study subtle in-flight effects of various bullet constructions.

Governments, professional ballisticians, defence forces and ammunition manufacturers can supplement Doppler radar measurements with measurements gathered by telemetry probes fitted to larger projectiles.

General trends in drag or ballistic coefficient

In general, a pointed projectile will have a better drag coefficient (Cd) or ballistic coefficient (BC) than a round nosed bullet, and a round nosed bullet will have a better Cd or BC than a flat point bullet. Large radius curves, resulting in a shallower point angle, will produce lower drags, particularly at supersonic velocities. Hollow point bullets behave much like a flat point of the same point diameter. Projectiles designed for supersonic use often have a slightly tapered base at the rear, called a boat tail, which reduces air resistance in flight. The usefulness of a "tapered rear" for long-range firing was well established already by early 1870s, but technological difficulties prevented their wide adoption before well into 20th century. Cannelures, which are recessed rings around the projectile used to crimp the projectile securely into the case, will cause an increase in drag.

Analytical software was developed by the Ballistics Research Laboratory – later called the Army Research Laboratory – which reduced actual test range data to parametric relationships for projectile drag coefficient prediction.  Large caliber artillery also employ drag reduction mechanisms in addition to streamlining geometry. Rocket-assisted projectiles employ a small rocket motor that ignites upon muzzle exit providing additional thrust to overcome aerodynamic drag.  Rocket assist is most effective with subsonic artillery projectiles. For supersonic long range artillery, where base drag dominates, base bleed is employed.  Base bleed is a form of a gas generator that does not provide significant thrust, but rather fills the low-pressure area behind the projectile with gas, effectively reducing the base drag and the overall projectile drag coefficient.

Transonic problem
A projectile fired at supersonic muzzle velocity will at some point slow to approach the speed of sound. At the transonic region (about Mach 1.2–0.8) the centre of pressure (CP) of most non spherical projectiles shifts forward as the projectile decelerates. That CP shift affects the (dynamic) stability of the projectile. If the projectile is not well stabilized, it cannot remain pointing forward through the transonic region (the projectile starts to exhibit an unwanted precession or coning motion called limit cycle yaw that, if not damped out, can eventually end in uncontrollable tumbling along the length axis). However, even if the projectile has sufficient stability (static and dynamic) to be able to fly through the transonic region and stays pointing forward, it is still affected. The erratic and sudden CP shift and (temporary) decrease of dynamic stability can cause significant dispersion (and hence significant accuracy decay), even if the projectile's flight becomes well behaved again when it enters the subsonic region. This makes accurately predicting the ballistic behavior of projectiles in the transonic region very difficult. 

Because of this, marksmen normally restrict themselves to engaging targets close enough that the projectile is still supersonic.
In 2015 the American ballistician Bryan Litz introduced the "Extended Long Range" concept to define rifle shooting at ranges where supersonic fired (rifle) bullets enter the transonic region. According to Litz, "Extended Long Range starts whenever the bullet slows to its transonic range. As the bullet slows down to approach Mach 1, it starts to encounter transonic effects, which are more complex and difficult to account for, compared to the supersonic range where the bullet is relatively well-behaved."

The ambient air density has a significant effect on dynamic stability during transonic transition. Though the ambient air density is a variable environmental factor, adverse transonic transition effects can be negated better by a projectile traveling through less dense air, than when traveling through denser air. Projectile or bullet length also affects limit cycle yaw. Longer projectiles experience more limit cycle yaw than shorter projectiles of the same diameter. Another feature of projectile design that has been identified as having an effect on the unwanted limit cycle yaw motion is the chamfer at the base of the projectile. At the very base, or heel of a projectile or bullet, there is a  chamfer, or radius. The presence of this radius causes the projectile to fly with greater limit cycle yaw angles. Rifling can also have a subtle effect on limit cycle yaw. In general faster spinning projectiles experience less limit cycle yaw.

Research into guided projectiles
To circumvent the transonic problems encountered by spin-stabilized projectiles, projectiles can theoretically be guided during flight. The Sandia National Laboratories announced in January 2012 it has researched and test-fired 4-inch (102 mm) long prototype dart-like, self-guided bullets for small-caliber, smooth-bore firearms that could hit laser-designated targets at distances of more than a mile (about 1,610 meters or 1760 yards). These projectiles are not spin stabilized and the flight path can steered within limits with an electromagnetic actuator 30 times per second. The researchers also claim they have video of the bullet radically pitching as it exits the barrel and pitching less as it flies down range, a disputed phenomenon known to long-range firearms experts as “going to sleep”. Because the bullet's motions settle the longer it is in flight, accuracy improves at longer ranges, Sandia researcher Red Jones said. “Nobody had ever seen that, but we’ve got high-speed video photography that shows that it’s true,” he said. Recent testing indicates it may be approaching or already achieved initial operational capability.

Testing the predictive qualities of software
Due to the practical inability to know in advance and compensate for all the variables of flight, no software simulation, however advanced, will yield predictions that will always perfectly match real world trajectories. It is however possible to obtain predictions that are very close to actual flight behavior.

Empirical measurement method
Ballistic prediction computer programs intended for (extreme) long ranges can be evaluated by conducting field tests at the supersonic to subsonic transition range (the last 10 to 20% of the supersonic range of the rifle/cartridge/bullet combination). For a typical .338 Lapua Magnum rifle for example, shooting standard 16.2 gram (250 gr) Lapua Scenar GB488 bullets at 905 m/s (2969 ft/s) muzzle velocity, field testing of the software should be done at ≈ 1200-1300 meters (1312-1422 yd) under International Standard Atmosphere sea level conditions (air density ρ = 1.225 kg/m³). To check how well the software predicts the trajectory at shorter to medium range, field tests at 20, 40 and 60% of the supersonic range have to be conducted. At those shorter to medium ranges, transonic problems and hence unbehaved bullet flight should not occur, and the BC is less likely to be transient. Testing the predictive qualities of software at (extreme) long ranges is expensive because it consumes ammunition; the actual muzzle velocity of all shots fired must be measured to be able to make statistically dependable statements. Sample groups of less than 24 shots may not obtain the desired statistically significant confidence interval.

Doppler radar measurement method
Governments, professional ballisticians, defence forces and a few ammunition manufacturers use Doppler radars and/or telemetry probes fitted to larger projectiles to obtain precise real world data regarding the flight behavior of the specific projectiles of their interest and thereupon compare the gathered real world data against the predictions calculated by ballistic computer programs. The normal shooting or aerodynamics enthusiast, however, has no access to such expensive professional measurement devices. Authorities and projectile manufacturers are generally reluctant to share the results of Doppler radar tests and the test derived drag coefficients (Cd) of projectiles with the general public.
Around 2020 more affordable but less capable (amateur) Doppler rader equipment to determine free flight drag coefficients became available for the general public.

In January 2009 the Scandinavian ammunition manufacturer Nammo/Lapua published Doppler radar test-derived drag coefficient data for most of their rifle projectiles.
In 2015 the US ammunition manufacturer Berger Bullets announced the use of Doppler radar in unison with PRODAS 6 DoF software to generate trajectory solutions.
In 2016 US ammunition manufacturer Hornady announced the use of Doppler radar derived drag data in software utilizing a modified point mass model to generate trajectory solutions.
With the measurement derived Cd data engineers can create algorithms that utilize both known mathematical ballistic models as well as test specific, tabular data in unison. When used by predictive software like QuickTARGET Unlimited, Lapua Edition, Lapua Ballistics or Hornady 4DOF the Doppler radar test-derived drag coefficient data can be used for more accurate external ballistic predictions.

Some of the Lapua-provided drag coefficient data shows drastic increases in the measured drag around or below the Mach 1 flight velocity region. This behavior was observed for most of the measured small calibre bullets, and not so much for the larger calibre bullets. This implies some (mostly smaller calibre) rifle bullets exhibited more limit cycle yaw (coning and/or tumbling) in the transonic/subsonic flight velocity regime.
The information regarding unfavourable transonic/subsonic flight behavior for some of the tested projectiles is important. This is a limiting factor for extended range shooting use, because the effects of limit cycle yaw are not easily predictable and potentially catastrophic for the best ballistic prediction models and software.

Presented Cd data can not be simply used for every gun-ammunition combination, since it was measured for the barrels, rotational (spin) velocities and ammunition lots the Lapua testers used during their test firings. Variables like differences in rifling (number of grooves, depth, width and other dimensional properties), twist rates and/or muzzle velocities impart different rotational (spin) velocities and rifling marks on projectiles. Changes in such variables and projectile production lot variations can yield different downrange interaction with the air the projectile passes through that can result in (minor) changes in flight behavior. This particular field of external ballistics is currently (2009) not elaborately studied nor well understood.

Predictions of several drag resistance modelling and measuring methods
The method employed to model and predict external ballistic behavior can yield differing results with increasing range and time of flight. To illustrate this several external ballistic behavior prediction methods for the Lapua Scenar GB528 19.44 g (300 gr) 8.59 mm (0.338 in) calibre very-low-drag rifle bullet with a manufacturer stated G1 ballistic coefficient (BC) of 0.785 fired at 830 m/s (2723 ft/s) muzzle velocity under International Standard Atmosphere sea level conditions (air density ρ = 1.225 kg/m³), Mach 1 = 340.3 m/s, Mach 1.2 = 408.4 m/s), predicted this for the projectile velocity and time of flight from 0 to 3,000 m (0 to 3,281 yd):

The table shows the Doppler radar test derived drag coefficients (Cd) prediction method and the 2017 Lapua Ballistics 6 DoF App predictions produce similar results. At  the total drop predictions deviate 47.5 cm (19.7 in) or 0.20 mil (0.68 moa) at 50° latitude and up to  the total drop predictions are within 0.30 mil (1 moa) at 50° latitude. The 2016 Lapua Ballistics 6 DoF App version predictions were even closer to the Doppler radar test predictions.

The traditional Siacci/Mayevski G1 drag curve model prediction method generally yields more optimistic results compared to the modern Doppler radar test derived drag coefficients (Cd) prediction method.
At  range the projectile velocity predictions deviate 25 m/s (82.0 ft/s), which equates to a predicted total drop difference of 125.6 cm (49.4 in) or 0.83 mil (2.87 moa) at 50° latitude.

The Pejsa drag model closed-form solution prediction method, without slope constant factor fine tuning, yields very similar results in the supersonic flight regime compared to the Doppler radar test derived drag coefficients (Cd) prediction method. At  range the projectile velocity predictions deviate 10 m/s (32.8 ft/s), which equates to a predicted total drop difference of 23.6 cm (9.3 in) or 0.16 mil (0.54 moa) at 50° latitude.

The G7 drag curve model prediction method (recommended by some manufacturers for very-low-drag shaped rifle bullets) when using a G7 ballistic coefficient (BC) of 0.377 yields very similar results in the supersonic flight regime compared to the Doppler radar test derived drag coefficients (Cd) prediction method. At  range the projectile velocity predictions have their maximum deviation of 10 m/s (32.8 ft/s).

Decent prediction models are expected to yield similar results in the supersonic flight regime. The five example models down to  all predict supersonic Mach 1.2+ projectile velocities and total drop differences within a 51 cm (20.1 in) bandwidth. In the transonic flight regime at  the models predict projectile velocities around Mach 1.0 to Mach 1.1 and total drop differences within a much larger 150 cm (59 in) bandwidth.

External factors

Wind
Wind has a range of effects, the first being the effect of making the projectile deviate to the side (horizontal deflection). From a scientific perspective, the "wind pushing on the side of the projectile" is not what causes horizontal wind drift. What causes wind drift is drag. Drag makes the projectile turn into the wind, much like a weather vane, keeping the centre of air pressure on its nose. This causes the nose to be cocked (from your perspective) into the wind, the base is cocked (from your perspective) "downwind." So, (again from your perspective), the drag is pushing the projectile downwind in a nose to tail direction.

Wind also causes aerodynamic jump which is the vertical component of cross wind deflection caused by lateral (wind) impulses activated during free flight of a projectile or at or very near the muzzle leading to dynamic imbalance. The amount of aerodynamic jump is dependent on cross wind speed, the gyroscopic stability of the bullet at the muzzle and if the barrel twist is clockwise or anti-clockwise. Like the wind direction reversing the twist direction will reverse the aerodynamic jump direction.

A somewhat less obvious effect is caused by head or tailwinds. A headwind will slightly increase the relative velocity of the projectile, and increase drag and the corresponding drop. A tailwind will reduce the drag and the projectile/bullet drop. In the real world, pure head or tailwinds are rare, since wind is seldom constant in force and direction and normally interacts with the terrain it is blowing over. This often makes ultra long range shooting in head or tailwind conditions difficult.

Vertical angles
The vertical angle (or elevation) of a shot will also affect the trajectory of the shot. Ballistic tables for small calibre projectiles (fired from pistols or rifles) assume a horizontal line of sight between the shooter and target with gravity acting perpendicular to the earth. Therefore, if the shooter-to-target angle is up or down, (the direction of the gravity component does not change with slope direction), then the trajectory curving acceleration due to gravity will actually be less, in proportion to the cosine of the slant angle. As a result, a projectile fired upward or downward, on a so-called "slant range," will over-shoot the same target distance on flat ground. The effect is of sufficient magnitude that hunters must adjust their target hold off accordingly in mountainous terrain. A well known formula for slant range adjustment to horizontal range hold off is known as the Rifleman's rule. The Rifleman's rule and the slightly more complex and less well known Improved Rifleman's rule models produce sufficiently accurate predictions for many small arms applications. Simple prediction models however ignore minor gravity effects when shooting uphill or downhill. The only practical way to compensate for this is to use a ballistic computer program. Besides gravity at very steep angles over long distances, the effect of air density changes the projectile encounters during flight become problematic.
The mathematical prediction models available for inclined fire scenarios, depending on the amount and direction (uphill or downhill) of the inclination angle and range, yield varying accuracy expectation levels.
Less advanced ballistic computer programs predict the same trajectory for uphill and downhill shots at the same vertical angle and range. The more advanced programs factor in the small effect of gravity on uphill and on downhill shots resulting in slightly differing trajectories at the same vertical angle and range. No publicly available ballistic computer program currently (2017) accounts for the complicated phenomena of differing air densities the projectile encounters during flight.

Ambient air density
Air pressure, temperature, and humidity variations make up the ambient air density. Humidity has a counter intuitive impact. Since water vapor has a density of 0.8 grams per litre, while dry air averages about 1.225 grams per litre, higher humidity actually decreases the air density, and therefore decreases the drag.

Precipitation
Precipitation can cause significant yaw and accompanying deflection when a bullet collides with a raindrop. The further downrange such a coincidental collision occurs, the less the deflection on target will be. The weight of the raindrop and bullet also influences how much yaw is induced during such a collision. A big heavy raindrop and a light bullet will yield maximal yaw effect. A heavy bullet colliding with an equal raindrop will experience significant less yaw effect.

Long range factors

Gyroscopic drift (Spin drift)
Gyroscopic drift is an interaction of the bullet's mass and aerodynamics with the atmosphere that it is flying in.
Even in completely calm air, with no sideways air movement at all, a spin-stabilized projectile will experience a spin-induced sideways component, due to a gyroscopic phenomenon known as "yaw of repose." For a right hand (clockwise) direction of rotation this component will always be to the right. For a left hand (counterclockwise) direction of rotation this component will always be to the left.
This is because the projectile's longitudinal axis (its axis of rotation) and the direction of the velocity vector of the center of gravity (CG) deviate by a small angle, which is said to be the equilibrium yaw or the yaw of repose. The magnitude of the yaw of repose angle is typically less than 0.5 degree. Since rotating objects react with an angular velocity vector 90 degrees from the applied torque vector, the bullet's axis of symmetry moves with a component in the vertical plane and a component in the horizontal plane; for right-handed (clockwise) spinning bullets, the bullet's axis of symmetry deflects to the right and a little bit upward with respect to the direction of the velocity vector, as the projectile moves along its ballistic arc. As the result of this small inclination, there is a continuous air stream, which tends to deflect the bullet to the right. Thus the occurrence of the yaw of repose is the reason for the bullet drifting to the right (for right-handed spin) or to the left (for left-handed spin). This means that the bullet is "skidding" sideways at any given moment, and thus experiencing a sideways component.

The following variables affect the magnitude of gyroscopic drift:
 Projectile or bullet length: longer projectiles experience more gyroscopic drift because they produce more lateral "lift" for a given yaw angle.
 Spin rate: faster spin rates will produce more gyroscopic drift because the nose ends up pointing farther to the side.
 Range, time of flight and trajectory height: gyroscopic drift increases with all of these variables.
 density of the atmosphere: denser air will increase gyroscopic drift.

Doppler radar measurement results for the gyroscopic drift of several US military and other very-low-drag bullets at 1000 yards (914.4 m) look like this:

The table shows that the gyroscopic drift cannot be predicted on weight and diameter alone.  In order to make accurate predictions on gyroscopic drift several details about both the external and internal ballistics must be considered.  Factors such as the twist rate of the barrel, the velocity of the projectile as it exits the muzzle, barrel harmonics, and atmospheric conditions, all contribute to the path of a projectile.

Magnus effect

Spin stabilized projectiles are affected by the Magnus effect, whereby the spin of the bullet creates a force acting either up or down, perpendicular to the sideways vector of the wind.
In the simple case of horizontal wind, and a right hand (clockwise) direction of rotation, the Magnus effect induced pressure differences around the bullet cause a downward (wind from the right) or upward (wind from the left) force viewed from the point of firing to act on the projectile, affecting its point of impact. The vertical deflection value tends to be small in comparison with the horizontal wind induced deflection component, but it may nevertheless be significant in winds that exceed 4 m/s (14.4 km/h or 9 mph).

Magnus effect and bullet stability
The Magnus effect has a significant role in bullet stability because the Magnus force does not act upon the bullet's center of gravity, but the center of pressure affecting the yaw of the bullet. The Magnus effect will act as a destabilizing force on any bullet with a center of pressure located ahead of the center of gravity, while conversely acting as a stabilizing force on any bullet with the center of pressure located behind the center of gravity. The location of the center of pressure depends on the flow field structure, in other words, depending on whether the bullet is in supersonic, transonic or subsonic flight. What this means in practice depends on the shape and other attributes of the bullet, in any case the Magnus force greatly affects stability because it tries to "twist" the bullet along its flight path.

Paradoxically, very-low-drag bullets due to their length have a tendency to exhibit greater Magnus destabilizing errors because they have a greater surface area to present to the oncoming air they are travelling through, thereby reducing their aerodynamic efficiency. This subtle effect is one of the reasons why a calculated Cd or BC based on shape and sectional density is of limited use.

Poisson effect
Another minor cause of drift, which depends on the nose of the projectile being above the trajectory, is the Poisson Effect. This, if it occurs at all, acts in the same direction as the gyroscopic drift and is even less important than the Magnus effect. It supposes that the uptilted nose of the projectile causes an air cushion to build up underneath it. It further supposes that there is an increase of friction between this cushion and the projectile so that the latter, with its spin, will tend to roll off the cushion and move sideways.

This simple explanation is quite popular. There is, however, no evidence to show that increased pressure means increased friction and unless this is so, there can be no effect. Even if it does exist it must be quite insignificant compared with the gyroscopic and Coriolis drifts.

Both the Poisson and Magnus Effects will reverse their directions of drift if the nose falls below the trajectory. When the nose is off to one side, as in equilibrium yaw, these effects will make minute alterations in range.

Coriolis drift

The Coriolis effect causes Coriolis drift in a direction perpendicular to the Earth's axis; for most locations on Earth and firing directions, this deflection includes horizontal and vertical components. The deflection is to the right of the trajectory in the northern hemisphere, to the left in the southern hemisphere, upward for eastward shots, and downward for westward shots.  The vertical Coriolis deflection is also known as the Eötvös effect. Coriolis drift is not an aerodynamic effect; it is a consequence of the rotation of the Earth.

The magnitude of the Coriolis effect is small. The magnitude of the drift depends on the firing and target location, azimuth of firing, projectile velocity and time of flight.

Horizontal effect
Viewed from a non-rotating reference frame (i.e. not one rotating with the Earth) and ignoring the forces of gravity and air resistance, a projectile moves in a straight line.  When viewed from a reference frame fixed with respect to the Earth, that straight trajectory appears to curve sideways.  The direction of this horizontal curvature is to the right in the northern hemisphere and to the left in the southern hemisphere, and does not depend on the azimuth of the shot. The horizontal curvature is largest at the poles and decreases to zero at the equator.

Vertical (Eötvös) effect
The Eötvös effect changes the perceived gravitational pull on a moving object based on the relationship between the direction and velocity of movement and the direction of the Earth's rotation.

The Eötvös effect is largest at the equator and decreases to zero at the poles. It causes eastward-traveling projectiles to deflect upward, and westward-traveling projectiles to deflect downward. The effect is less pronounced for trajectories in other directions, and is zero for trajectories aimed due north or south. In the case of large changes of momentum, such as a spacecraft being launched into Earth orbit, the effect becomes significant. It contributes to the fastest and most fuel-efficient path to orbit: a launch from the equator that curves to a directly eastward heading.

Equipment factors
Though not forces acting on projectile trajectories there are some equipment related factors that influence trajectories. Since these factors can cause otherwise unexplainable external ballistic flight behavior they have to be briefly mentioned.

Lateral jump
Lateral jump is caused by a slight lateral and rotational movement of a gun barrel at the instant of firing. It has the effect of a small error in bearing. The effect is ignored, since it is small and varies from round to round.

Lateral throw-off
Lateral throw-off is caused by mass imbalance in applied spin stabilized projectiles or pressure imbalances during the transitional flight phase when a projectile leaves a gun barrel off axis leading to static imbalance. If present it causes dispersion. The effect is unpredictable, since it is generally small and varies from projectile to projectile, round to round and/or gun barrel to gun barrel.

Maximum effective small arms range
The maximum practical range of all small arms and especially high-powered sniper rifles depends mainly on the aerodynamic or ballistic efficiency of the spin stabilised projectiles used. Long-range shooters must also collect relevant information to calculate elevation and windage corrections to be able to achieve first shot strikes at point targets. The data to calculate these fire control corrections has a long list of variables including:
 ballistic coefficient or test derived drag coefficients (Cd)/behavior of the bullets used
 height of the sighting components above the rifle bore axis
 the zero range at which the sighting components and rifle combination were sighted in
 bullet mass
 actual muzzle velocity (powder temperature affects muzzle velocity, primer ignition is also temperature dependent)
 range to target
 supersonic range of the employed gun, cartridge and bullet combination
 inclination angle in case of uphill/downhill firing
 target speed and direction
 wind speed and direction (main cause for horizontal projectile deflection and generally the hardest ballistic variable to measure and judge correctly. Wind effects can also cause vertical deflection.)
 air pressure, temperature, altitude and humidity variations (these make up the ambient air density)
 Earth's gravity (changes slightly with latitude and altitude) 
 gyroscopic drift (horizontal and vertical plane gyroscopic effect — often known as spin drift - induced by the barrel's twist direction and twist rate)
 Coriolis effect drift (latitude, direction of fire and northern or southern hemisphere data dictate this effect)
 Eötvös effect (interrelated with the Coriolis effect, latitude and direction of fire dictate this effect)
 aerodynamic jump (the vertical component of cross wind deflection caused by lateral (wind) impulses activated during free flight or at or very near the muzzle leading to dynamic imbalance)
 lateral throw-off (dispersion that is caused by mass imbalance in the applied projectile or it leaving the barrel off axis leading to static imbalance)
 the inherent potential accuracy and adjustment range of the sighting components
 the inherent potential accuracy of the rifle
 the inherent potential accuracy of the ammunition
 the inherent potential accuracy of the computer program and other firing control components used to calculate the trajectory

The ambient air density is at its maximum at Arctic sea level conditions. Cold gunpowder also produces lower pressures and hence lower muzzle velocities than warm powder. This means that the maximum practical range of rifles will be at it shortest at Arctic sea level conditions.

The ability to hit a point target at great range has a lot to do with the ability to tackle environmental and meteorological factors and a good understanding of exterior ballistics and the limitations of equipment. Without (computer) support and highly accurate laser rangefinders and meteorological measuring equipment as aids to determine ballistic solutions, long-range shooting beyond 1000 m (1100 yd) at unknown ranges becomes guesswork for even the most expert long-range marksmen.

Interesting further reading: Marksmanship Wikibook

Using ballistics data
Here is an example of a ballistic table for a .30 calibre Speer 169 grain (11 g) pointed boat tail match bullet, with a BC of 0.480. It assumes sights 1.5 inches (38 mm) above the bore line, and sights adjusted to result in point of aim and point of impact matching 200 yards (183 m) and 300 yards (274 m) respectively.

This table demonstrates that, even with a fairly aerodynamic bullet fired at high velocity, the "bullet drop" or change in the point of impact is significant. This change in point of impact has two important implications. Secondly, the rifle should be zeroed to a distance appropriate to the typical range of targets, because the shooter might have to aim so far above the target to compensate for a large bullet drop that he may lose sight of the target completely (for instance being outside the field of view of a telescopic sight).

See also
Internal ballistics - The behavior of the projectile and propellant before it leaves the barrel.
Transitional ballistics - The behavior of the projectile from the time it leaves the muzzle until the pressure behind the projectile is equalized.
Terminal ballistics - The behavior of the projectile upon impact with the target.
Trajectory of a projectile - Basic external ballistics mathematic formulas.
Rifleman's rule - Procedures or "rules" for a rifleman for aiming at targets at a distance either uphill or downhill.
Franklin Ware Mann - Early scientific study of external ballistics.
Table of handgun and rifle cartridges
Sighting in - Calibrating the sights on a ranged weapon so that the point of aim intersects with the trajectory at a given distance, allowing the user to consistently hit the target being aimed at.

Notes

References

External links
General external ballistics
  (Simplified calculation of the motion of a projectile under a drag force proportional to the square of the velocity)
  - basketball ballistics.

Small arms external ballistics
 Software for calculating ball ballistics
 How do bullets fly? by Ruprecht Nennstiel, Wiesbaden, Germany
 Exterior Ballistics.com articles 
 A Short Course in External Ballistics
 Articles on long range shooting by Bryan Litz
 Probabalistic Weapon Employment Zone (WEZ) Analysis A Conceptual Overview by Bryan Litz 
 Weite Schüsse - part 4, Basic explanation of the Pejsa model by Lutz Möller 
 Patagonia Ballistics ballistics mathematical software engine
 JBM Small Arms Ballistics with online ballistics calculators
 Bison Ballistics Point Mass Online Ballistics Calculator 
 Virtual Wind Tunnel Experiments for Small Caliber Ammunition Aerodynamic Characterization - Paul Weinacht US Army Research Laboratory Aberdeen Proving Ground, MD

Artillery external ballistics
 British Artillery Fire Control - Ballistics & Data
 Field Artillery, Volume 6, Ballistics and Ammunition
 The Production of Firing Tables for Cannon Artillery, BRL rapport no. 1371 by Elizabeth R. Dickinson, U.S. Army Materiel Command Ballistic Research Laboratories, November 1967
 NABK (NATO Armament Ballistic Kernel) Based Next Generation Ballistic Table Tookit, 23rd International Symposium on Ballistics, Tarragona, Spain 16-20 April 2007
Trajectory Calculator in C++ that can deduce drag function from firing tables

Freeware small arms external ballistics software
 Hawke X-ACT Pro FREE ballistics app. iOS, Android, OSX & Windows.
 ChairGun Pro free ballistics for rim fire and pellet guns.
 Ballistic_XLR. (MS Excel spreadsheet)] - A substantial enhancement & modification of the Pejsa spreadsheet (below).
 GNU Exterior Ballistics Computer (GEBC) - An open source 3DOF ballistics computer for Windows, Linux, and Mac - Supports the G1, G2, G5, G6, G7, and G8 drag models.  Created and maintained by Derek Yates.
6mmbr.com ballistics section links to / hosts 4 freeware external ballistics computer programs.
 2DOF & 3DOF R.L. McCoy - Gavre exterior ballistics (zip file) - Supports the G1, G2, G5, G6, G7, G8, GS, GL, GI, GB and RA4 drag models
 PointBlank Ballistics (zip file) - Siacci/Mayevski G1 drag model.
 Remington Shoot! A ballistic calculator for Remington factory ammunition (based on Pinsoft's Shoot! software). - Siacci/Mayevski G1 drag model.
 JBM's small-arms ballistics calculators Online trajectory calculators - Supports the G1, G2, G5, G6, G7 (for some projectiles experimentally measured G7 ballistic coefficients), G8, GI, GL and for some projectiles doppler radar-test derived (Cd) drag models.
 Pejsa Ballistics (MS Excel spreadsheet) - Pejsa model.
 Sharpshooter Friend (Palm PDA software) - Pejsa model.
 Quick Target Unlimited, Lapua Edition - A version of QuickTARGET Unlimited ballistic software (requires free registration to download) - Supports the G1, G2, G5, G6, G7, G8, GL, GS Spherical 9/16"SAAMI, GS Spherical Don Miller, RA4, Soviet 1943, British 1909 Hatches Notebook and for some Lapua projectiles doppler radar-test derived (Cd) drag models.
 Lapua Ballistics Exterior ballistic software for Java or Android mobile phones. Based on doppler radar-test derived (Cd) drag models for Lapua projectiles and cartridges.
 Lapua Ballistics App 6 DoF model limited to Lapua bullets for Android and iOS.
 BfX - Ballistics for Excel Set of MS Excel add-ins functions - Supports the G1, G2, G5, G6, G7 G8 and RA4 and Pejsa drag models as well as one for air rifle pellets. Able to handle user supplied models, e.g. Lapua projectiles doppler radar-test derived (Cd) ones.
 GunSim "GunSim" free browser-based ballistics simulator program for Windows and Mac.
 BallisticSimulator "Ballistic Simulator" free ballistics simulator program for Windows.
 5H0T Free online web-based ballistics calculator, with data export capability and charting.
 SAKO Ballistics  Free online ballistic calculatoy by SAKO. Calculator also available as an android app (mybe on iOs also, I don't know) under "SAKO Ballistics" name.

Ballistics
Projectiles
Aerodynamics
Articles containing video clips